.

Benjamin Berton (born 1974, Valenciennes) is a French writer.

Biography 
Benjamin Berton is graduated from the Institut d’études politiques de Paris and holder of a D.E.A. of social and cultural history. Sauvageons, a chronicle of the lives of northern teenagers in need of reference points, won the prix Goncourt du premier roman in 2000 as well as the Prix littéraire de la vocation the same year. He lives in Le Mans, where the action of La Chambre à remonter le temps takes place.

Works 
 2000: Sauvageons
 2001: Classe Affaires
 2004: Pirates
 2007: Foudres de guerre
 2009: Alain Delon est une star au Japon
 2011: La Chambre à remonter le temps
 2014: Le Nuage radioactif
 2015: J'étais la terreur

References

External links 
 Biography on RING
 Benjamin Berton on Babelio
 Benjamin Berton. L'écrivain sarthois dans la peau d'un frère Kouachi on Ouest France (10 July 2015)
 Benjamin Berton présente le Nuage Radioactif on YouTube

1974 births
People from Valenciennes
Living people
21st-century French non-fiction writers
Prix Goncourt du Premier Roman recipients